Gratin dauphinois is a French dish of sliced potatoes baked in milk or cream, using the gratin technique, from the Dauphiné region in south-eastern France. There are many variants of the name of the dish, including pommes de terre dauphinoise, potatoes à la dauphinoise and gratin de pommes à la dauphinoise. It is called potatoes au gratin in American English.

History
The first mention of the dish is from 12 July 1788. It was served with ortolans at a dinner given by Charles-Henri, Duke of Clermont-Tonnerre and Lieutenant-general of the Dauphiné, for the municipal officials of the town of Gap, now in the département of Hautes-Alpes.

Preparation
Gratin dauphinois is made with thinly sliced raw potatoes, milk or cream, and sometimes Gruyère cheese, cooked in a buttered dish rubbed with garlic. The potatoes are peeled and sliced to the thickness of a coin, usually with a mandoline; they are layered in a shallow earthenware or glass baking dish and cooked in a slow oven; the heat is raised for the last 10 minutes of the cooking time.

Some purists insist that a gratin dauphinois must not include cheese, which would make it a gratin savoyard. Nonetheless, recipes given by many chefs including Auguste Escoffier, Austin de Croze, Robert Carrier, and Constance Spry call for cheese and eggs.

It is distinguished from ordinary gratin potatoes by the use of raw rather than boiled potatoes. It is a quite different dish from pommes dauphine.

See also
 List of casserole dishes

References

External links
  The website of gratin dauphinois

French cuisine
Potato dishes
Casserole dishes
Milk dishes